Albert "Aby" Gartmann (April 23, 1930 - April 6, 2018) was a Swiss bobsledder who competed in the mid-1950s. He won a silver medal in the four-man event at the 1955 FIBT World Championships in St. Moritz.

Gartmann also finished fourth in the four-man event at the 1956 Winter Olympics in Cortina d'Ampezzo.

References

External links 
 

1930 births
2018 deaths
Bobsledders at the 1956 Winter Olympics
Swiss male bobsledders
Olympic bobsledders of Switzerland
20th-century Swiss people